Sardar Bukan Football Club is an Iranian football club based in Bukan(Bukan) and playing in the Iranian League 2.

In 2017, the club became famous for its high attendance despite the club playing in Bukan city and in the third tier. They are one of the best supported teams in the northwest of Iran.

History

Establishment
Sardar Bukan was founded in 2000 and began playing in the West Azerbaijan Provincial League. The team's name comes from Aziz Khan Mukri who was called Sardar and was the head of the Iranian Army during the reign of Naser al-Din Shah Qajar.

Promotions
They finished as runners up in 2001 and champions in 2002, earning promotion to League 3. In 2005 the club started its professional functions, and in 2015 for the first time, the club began to play in League 2, which is the Iranian third tier. In the 2016–17 season they barely missed out on promotion to the Azadegan League (2nd tier).

Players
As of 21 September 2017:

Current squad

Personnel

Coaching Staff

Sources

Football clubs in Iran
Sport in West Azerbaijan Province